Blake Parlett (born May 13, 1989) is a Canadian professional ice hockey player currently contracted to Nürnberg Ice Tigers of the Deutsche Eishockey Liga (DEL).

Playing career
Parlett played Major Junior Hockey in the Ontario Hockey League, the last as an overage player for Mississauga St. Michael's Majors. He turned professional with the Hartford Wolf Pack of the American Hockey League during the 2010–11 season.

Parlett split his first season between the Wolf Pack/Whale and ECHL affiliate, the Greenville Road Warriors, earning a starting position in the 2011 ECHL All-Star Game.

He was signed to a two-year entry level contract by the Whale's parent club, the New York Rangers, on June 2, 2011.

During the 2012–13 season with the Connecticut Whale, Parlett was included, along with Steven Delisle, as part of the package in the deadline trade of Marian Gaborik from the Rangers to the Columbus Blue Jackets in exchange for Derick Brassard, Derek Dorsett, John Moore and a sixth-round pick on April 3, 2013. Parlett was immediately reassigned to AHL affiliate, the Springfield Falcons.

On February 7, 2014, Parlett was traded to the Boston Bruins in exchange for Carter Camper. and was assigned to the AHL affiliate, the Providence Bruins, for the remainder of the season.

On July 2, 2014, Parlett signed a one-year, two-way contract with the Florida Panthers. In the 2014–15 campaign, Parlett was assigned to AHL affiliate, the San Antonio Rampage, for the duration of the season.

On June 10, 2015, approaching free agency, and unable to break into the NHL, Parlett signed a one-year contract with Croatian KHL club, Medveščak. His Zagreb stint ended in early February 2017, when he signed with Finnish Liiga side Tappara.

Parlett inked an optional two-year deal with German Deutsche Eishockey Liga side Eisbären Berlin in June 2017. In the 2017–18 season, Parlett contributed with 17 points in 47 games to help Berlin reach the DEL finals.

On May 2, 2018, Parlett left Germany to return to the KHL in signing a one-year contract with Chinese outfit, Kunlun Red Star. In the 2018–19 season, Parlett contributed with 4 goals and 10 points in 32 games.

On June 25, 2019, Parlett continued his journeyman European career, signing for another stint in the DEL, agreeing to a one-year deal with EHC München. Parlett made 46 regular season appearances in Munich, posting 2 goals and 9 points, before the post-season was cancelled due to the COVID-19 pandemic.

Leaving Germany as a free agent, Parlett opted to continue his European career by returning to former club, Tappara of the Liiga, on July 31, 2020.

Career statistics

References

External links

1989 births
Living people
Barrie Colts players
Canadian ice hockey defencemen
Connecticut Whale (AHL) players
Eisbären Berlin players
Greenville Road Warriors players
Hartford Wolf Pack players
Ice hockey people from Ontario
KHL Medveščak Zagreb players
HC Kunlun Red Star players
Mississauga St. Michael's Majors players
EHC München players
Nürnberg Ice Tigers players
People from Bracebridge, Ontario
Providence Bruins players
San Antonio Rampage players
Springfield Falcons players
Tappara players
Windsor Spitfires players
Canadian expatriate ice hockey players in Croatia
Canadian expatriate ice hockey players in China
Canadian expatriate ice hockey players in Finland
Canadian expatriate ice hockey players in Germany